is a railway station in the city of Atami, Shizuoka Prefecture, Japan, jointly operated by East Japan Railway Company (JR East) and Central Japan Railway Company (JR Central).

Lines 
Atami Station is served by the JR Central  Tōkaidō Shinkansen and is 104.6 km from Tokyo Station, as well as  Tōkaidō Main Line serves extending westward from Atami. The JR East portion of the station serves the Tōkaidō Main Line between Tokyo Station and Atami, and the station is also the northern terminal station of the Itō Line.

Station layout
Due to its location on the side of a steep hill, Atami Station is built on several levels. On the lowest level is the station building itself, with automated ticket machines, Suica automated turnstiles and a "Midori no Madoguchi" staffed ticket office. The Tōkaidō Main Line and Ito Line share one side platform and two island platforms with five tracks connected by an underground passage to the station building. The Tōkaidō Shinkansen with two opposing side platforms is one level higher, and is connected to the lower platforms by an underground passage.

Platforms

History

Atami Station opened on March 25, 1925. On December 1, 1934, the Tanna Tunnel was completed, and through service to Mishima and Numazu began. The Ito Line began operations at Atami from March 30, 1935. The Tōkaidō Shinkansen opened on October 1, 1964.

Station numbering was introduced to the section of the Tōkaidō Line operated JR Central in March 2018; Atami Station was assigned station number CA00.

Passenger statistics
In fiscal 2017, the local portion of the station was used by an average of 10,653 passengers daily (boarding passengers only). and the Shinkansen portion of the station was used by 4805 passengers daily (boarding passengers only).

Surrounding area
 MOA Museum of Art

Accidents
On June 27, 2002, at 10:37, a person was hit and killed by a train at the station after climbing down from the platform onto the shinkansen track.

See also
 List of railway stations in Japan

References

Yoshikawa, Fumio. Tokaido-sen 130-nen no ayumi. Grand-Prix Publishing (2002) .

External links

JR Central station information  
JR East station information 

Stations of East Japan Railway Company
Stations of Central Japan Railway Company
Tōkaidō Main Line
Tōkaidō Shinkansen
Itō Line
Railway stations in Shizuoka Prefecture
Railway stations in Japan opened in 1925
Atami, Shizuoka